The Division of Streeton was an Australian Electoral Division in the state of Victoria. It was located on the eastern outskirts of Melbourne, and was named after the painter Sir Arthur Streeton. It covered the suburb of Croydon and the towns of Gembrook and Healesville.

The Division was proclaimed at the redistribution of 14 September 1984, and was first contested at the 1984 Federal election. It was abolished at the redistribution of 5 June 1989.

Members

Election results

Streeton
Constituencies established in 1984
Constituencies disestablished in 1990
1984 establishments in Australia
1990 disestablishments in Australia